Rakna Arakshaka Lanka also called Rakna Arakshaka Lanka LTD. under the companies Act No. 07 of 2007. Company was government own security service company. It's affiliations of the Ministry of Defence Sri Lanka. The company was founded by the former Secretary of the Ministry of Defence and currently serving President of Sri Lanka Gotabaya Rajapaksa. The company mainly target the commercial sector. In 2016 cabinet approval has been granted to dissolve the company. But company return from the after 2019 Sri Lankan presidential election. Most employees are retired Army officers and Police officers. Approximately 2,500 security officers serving today.

References 

2006 establishments in Sri Lanka
Companies established in 2006
Government-owned companies of Sri Lanka